Villa Angela Airport  is a public use airport located just southeast of Villa Angela, a city in the Chaco Province of Argentina.

See also

Transport in Argentina
List of airports in Argentina

References

External links 
 OpenStreetMap - Villa Angela Airport

Airports in Argentina
Chaco Province